Kittie is a Canadian heavy metal band formed in London, Ontario in 1996. All of their material has been released through independent record labels, which to date includes six studio albums, one video album, four extended plays, thirteen singles, and thirteen music videos. "Kittie" was chosen as the band name because the name "seemed contradictory." Kittie has been categorized under multiple genres, including nu metal, alternative metal and death metal.

Kittie formed in 1996 when Fallon Bowman and Mercedes Lander met in gym class. Morgan Lander became the lead vocalist and one of Kittie's guitarists and Tanya Candler completed the band's lineup on bass. After signing to NG Records, Kittie released their debut album Spit, which was certified gold by the RIAA and sold at least 600,000 copies in the United States. The band released Oracle in 2001 and Until the End in 2004. In 2005, Kittie parted ways with Artemis Records and created their own label. The band released Funeral for Yesterday in 2007 and signed to E1 Music in 2009. The band released In the Black in 2009 and I've Failed You in 2011, after which the band's members pursued various other projects.

Kittie went on an indefinite hiatus following the death of bassist Trish Doan on February 11, 2017. In 2018, a documentary, Kittie: Origins/Evolutions, chronicling the history of the band was released in co-ordination with its 20th anniversary. In 2022, Kittie reunited to perform at the Blue Ridge Rock and the When We Were Young festivals, and remain active.

History

Formation and early years (1996–2004)
Kittie was formed in 1996 when drummer Mercedes Lander and guitarist Fallon Bowman met in gym class. Morgan Lander, sister to Mercedes, became the lead vocalist and guitarist after weeks of Fallon and Mercedes jamming. Tanya Candler completed the lineup by joining as the bassist. Kittie recorded their first demos and began playing concerts in 1998. The band performed at Call the Office and the Embassy and signed up for Canadian Music Week in 1999. Kittie approached Jason Wyner, who was second-in-command at NG Records. After Jason saw the band perform live, NG Records signed Kittie in the summer of 1999. Kittie initially released their debut album Spit on NG Records on November 13, 1999; however, shortly after, NG Records was purchased by Artemis Records, and production was halted. Around the same time, Candler left the band and was replaced on bass by Talena Atfield. Artemis subsequently reissued Spit, with different artwork and photographs, on January 11, 2000. The album is the band's most successful album, being certified gold by the RIAA. Spit has sold at least 600,000 copies in the United States and at least 40,000 copies in Canada. They supported the album by touring with Slipknot.

Their debut album and supporting tour earned Kittie coverage in Metal Edge, whose readers voted Morgan Lander for "Female Performer of the Year" and Spit for "Home Video of the Year" in the magazine's 2000 Readers' Choice Awards. The band was also voted "New Band of the Year", "Who's Going to be the Next Big Thing", and "Most Underrated Band", earning them a total of five Metal Edge Readers' Choice Awards that year. On July 11, 2000, Kittie made a home-video called Spit in Your Eye which featured interviews of the band and the band playing shows with the band Slipknot. The success of Spit led Billboard to call Kittie "the most successful female band in modern metal" in December 2001.

In August 2001, Fallon Bowman left Kittie. Bowman explained why she left the band, saying: "I was unhappy with some things in the band so I felt that maybe it was time for me to depart. I think it was for the best". On October 30, 2001, Kittie released their second album Oracle. Sounding more aggressive than "Spit", the album features elements of death metal and thrash metal. Morgan Lander noted how the band members were only 14 years old when writing their debut album and said "We haven't written in 4 or 5 years." She acknowledged a change in influence from their early days, stating, "Then we listened to bands like Nirvana, Silverchair, and Alice in Chains. Now we listen to stuff like Cannibal Corpse and Nile." However, the band would continue to write in the same fashion by first composing the music and then using that "as the backdrop behind the vocals." The album Oracle was recorded with Morgan Lander as the sole guitarist. Fallon's position as guitarist was filled by Jeff Phillips who worked as Kittie's guitar technician. In 2002, Talena Atfield left the band and was replaced on bass by Jennifer Arroyo. In August 2003, Kittie and Garth Richardson sued Artemis over unpaid royalties and eleven breaches of contract by the label; the dispute was settled out of court in March 2004 . In 2004, the group added guitarist Lisa Marx, and Jeff Phillips went to work full-time on his side project, Thine Eyes Bleed. On July 27, 2004, Kittie released their third studio album Until the End.

Departure from Artemis and Funeral for Yesterday (2005–2007)
On March 23, 2005, Morgan Lander reported that both Lisa Marx and Jennifer Arroyo had left the band. Jennifer Arroyo's split was amicable while Lisa Marx's came as a surprise. Morgan cited financial difficulties, which they attributed to Artemis Records' poor promotion of their releases, as the reasons for both members' departures. Lander also revealed that Artemis and the band were in negotiations over whether the band's contract would be renewed, expressing her desire to leave the label. Arroyo confirmed that the split was amicable, and also cited her desire to work outside of Kittie full-time was an additional factor. She would go on to join Billy Graziadei of Biohazard to form Suicide City. 

On March 31, 2005, Kittie announced they had parted ways with Artemis Records due to "a proposed amendment to the recording budget for the pending fourth Kittie album." 

In 2005, Kittie added two new members: Tara McLeod on guitar and Trish Doan on bass. In 2005, Morgan and Mercedes Lander's clothing line, Poisoned Black clothing, started. Morgan and Mercedes also appeared briefly in the documentaries Metal: A Headbanger's Journey and Heavy Metal - Louder than Life. On February 7, 2006, Kittie released their Never Again EP through Rock Ridge Music. Also in 2006, vocalist Morgan Lander provided vocals on the song "It Turns to Rust", from the album In the Arms of Devastation, by the Canadian death metal band Kataklysm.

Kittie created their own record label, Kiss of Infamy Records, and used it to release their fourth studio album. The label name was later changed to "X of Infamy" after a cease-and-desist letter from attorneys representing Kiss Catalog Ltd. (the owner of the intellectual property rights pertaining to the musical group Kiss) alleging that the Kiss of Infamy trademark was "confusingly similar" to their client's trademark. Kittie's fourth studio album Funeral for Yesterday was released on February 20, 2007, through their record label. Along with the release of Funeral for Yesterday, Morgan Lander announced that Kittie would release a 45-minute-DVD with the CD. In February 2007, Kittie toured as part of the Funeral for Yesterday Tour alongside Walls of Jericho, 36 Crazyfists, Dead To Fall, and In This Moment.

In the Black and I've Failed You (2008–2011)
On March 4, 2008, Kittie announced the departure of Trish Doan due to the eating disorder anorexia, which she developed during the recording of Funeral for Yesterday. Doan had battled the disorder for nearly two years. Soon after, Ivy Vujic officially became the new bass player. On August 2, 2008, David Lander, father of band members Morgan and Mercedes and the band's manager, died of a heart attack.

On June 26, 2009, it was announced that Kittie signed to the E1 Music record label. The band's fifth studio album In the Black, was released on September 15, 2009. Videos were shot for two singles, "Cut Throat" and "Sorrow I Know". "Cut Throat" premiered on MTV 2's Headbangers Ball on September 5, 2009, and on the Canadian show Much Loud on September 20, 2009. "Cut Throat" also appeared on the Saw VI Soundtrack released on October 20, 2009, and also in Diary of a Wimpy Kid: Rodrick Rules, released on March 25, 2011. On September 16, 2009, an announcement was made that German label Massacre Records would distribute In the Black in Europe.

In January 2010, Kittie returned to Europe to promote In the Black. Supporting bands on the tour included It Dies Today and Malefice. This tour included dates in Scotland, England, France, Switzerland, Denmark, Belgium, Germany, Italy and the Netherlands. In a January 27, 2010 interview, Morgan Lander revealed that the band was in talks to film a video for the track "Die My Darling". In March 2010, Kittie embarked on another North American tour with God Forbid, Periphery and Gwen Stacy as support. From May through June 2010, Kittie took part in the Happy Daze tour headlined by Insane Clown Posse and featuring Coolio, Kottonmouth Kings and Necro.

Kittie participated in the 2010 Thrash and Burn tour through July and August which also featured Asking Alexandria, Born of Osiris, Evergreen Terrace, Stick to Your Guns, Chelsea Grin, Through the Eyes of the Dead, Impending Doom, Periphery and Greeley Estates. This was followed by a one-month stint as one of the two opening acts on Devildriver's 2010 North American tour.

Kittie's sixth studio album, titled I've Failed You, was released on August 30, 2011. Two videos were released for the songs "We Are the Lamb" and "Empires (Part 2)". In 2011, Mercedes Lander joined the all-female band the Alcohollys featuring former Kittie bassist Tanya Candler.

Documentary, death of Trish Doan, hiatus (2012–2022)
On February 13, 2012, Kittie announced that Ivy Vujic was resigning from the band and that Trish Doan would be returning.

In early 2014, Kittie posted information about a secret project that was in the works to their Facebook page. On March 8, Kittie posted photos on their Facebook and Instagram of past and present members all together in the same room with a camera. On March 28, 2014, Kittie launched an Indiegogo campaign celebrating the impending 20th anniversary of the band, with a DVD documentary featuring past and present members and a tell all book. Their goal of $20,000 was reached in eight hours.  The campaign closed on April 28, 2014, with a total amount of $40,525 raised, 203% of the initial goal.  Kittie slated Rob McCallum to direct the documentary and Mark Eglinton to help pen the biography.

In October 2016, it was announced that drummer/vocalist Mercedes Lander had started a new sludge/doom metal band called the White Swan that released the single "Illuminate". The debut EP, Anubis, was released on November 1, 2016.

On February 11, 2017, bassist Trish Doan died at the age of 31. Doan had moved to Australia in 2013 and had frequently used her social media accounts to speak of her frustrations with depression.

On August 30, 2017, the band announced that they would performing a three-set single concert on October 27, 2017, in their hometown of London, Ontario in the London Music Hall, featuring three different lineup variations made up of both current and former members. The concert marked the launch of their 20-year anniversary documentary, and featured the return of Candler, Bowman, Phillips, Arroyo and Vujic to perform songs from their respective eras. The concert was released on DVD format on March 26, 2019.

On March 30, 2018, the documentary Kittie: Origins/Evolutions, which was filmed prior to the reunion concert, was released on Blu-ray and DVD for the very first time. Like they did with reunion concert, Atfield and Marx declined to participate; according to Morgan Lander, Atfield was supportive of the documentary, appearing in the initial crowdfunding pitch video, but "didn’t think it was the right move for her" to appear. Packaged with the movie was a CD featuring a collection of live performances by the band.

In 2019, Morgan Lander expressed uncertainty about the future of the band, the primary reason being that she didn't feel right moving the band forward without Trish Doan. Several months later, it was announced that Lander had joined the melodic death metal band, Karkaos, as their new lead singer.

In October 2020, Mercedes Lander stated that it was unlikely that Kittie would reunite to perform again without a significant financial offer and the ability to include all of the band's former members. Like her sister, she also stated that she found it difficult to go forward with the band without Doan.

Return to performing (2022–present)
Despite the previous doubts of the Lander sisters, it was announced in January 2022 that Kittie would reunite to perform on all three days of the When We Were Young festival, scheduled to take place in Las Vegas, Nevada on October 22, 23, and 29, with Vujic returning to the band on bass for all three dates. After the announcement of the October performances, the band were added to the Blue Ridge Rock Festival at the Virginia International Raceway in Alton, Virginia on September 8, 2022. Morgan Lander has stated that, although nothing is set in stone, she believes the band will continue performing in 2023.

Musical style and influences
Kittie has been put under multiple genres of music. Kittie has often used death metal and black metal vocals in their songs and often had clean singing in those songs as well. On the Spit album, Kittie used screaming, clean singing and rapping. Kittie began as a  band but then abandoned the style. Kittie have been compared to bands such as Pantera, Slayer and Mudvayne.

Kittie is often known for being an all-female band. Kittie's drummer Mercedes Lander said that she wants Kittie to be seen as just a metal band instead of a "girl metal" band saying "You don’t call Machine Head a 'boy metal band,' you call them a metal band … Why should they make an exception [for us] just because of the gender? It's almost exactly the same kind of music, except we don't have penises."

The band cites as influences Marilyn Manson, Korn, Metallica, Cannibal Corpse, Nile, Carcass, At the Gates, Acid Bath, and Testament. When Kittie made their debut album, the band were listening to bands such as Silverchair, Alice in Chains and Nirvana. When asked about their influences in an interview with Metal Maidens in 1999, the members of Kittie cited Nile, Today Is the Day, Placebo, Far, Weezer, Orgy, Fear Factory, Hole, Tura Satana, Human Waste Project, Babes in Toyland, Misfits, Blondie, and Nasum as influences.

Band members

Current
 Morgan Lander – lead vocals, rhythm guitar, piano (1996–present)
 Mercedes Lander – drums, backing vocals (1996–present)
 Tara McLeod – lead guitar (2005–present)
 Ivana "Ivy" Vujic – bass (2007–2012; 2022–present)

Former
 Fallon Bowman – lead guitar, backing vocals (1996–2001) 
 Tanya Candler – bass, backing vocals (1997–1999)
 Talena Atfield – bass (1999–2002)
 Jeff Phillips – lead guitar, backing vocals (2001–2003) bass (2007)
 Jennifer Arroyo – bass (2002–2005)
 Lisa Marx – lead guitar (2004–2005)
 Trish Doan – bass (2005–2007, 2012–2017; died 2017)

Timeline

Discography

Studio albums
Spit (1999)
Oracle (2001)
Until the End (2004)
Funeral for Yesterday (2007)
In the Black (2009)
I've Failed You (2011)

References

External links

 

 

Canadian alternative metal musical groups
Canadian death metal musical groups
Canadian nu metal musical groups
All-female bands
Sibling musical groups
1996 establishments in Ontario
Musical groups established in 1996
Musical quartets
Musical groups from London, Ontario
MNRK Music Group artists
Rock Ridge Music artists
Female-fronted musical groups
Women in metal